Biennale, Italian for "biennial" or "every other year", is any event that happens every two years. It is most commonly used within the art world to describe large-scale international contemporary art exhibitions. As such the term was popularised by Venice Biennale, which was first held in 1895. Since the 1990s, the terms "biennale" and "biennial" have been interchangeably used in a more generic way - to signify a large-scale international survey show of contemporary art that recurs at regular intervals but not necessarily biannual (such as triennials, Documenta, Skulptur Projekte Münster). The phrase has also been used for other artistic events, such as the "Biennale de Paris", "Kochi-Muziris Biennale", Berlinale (for the Berlin International Film Festival) and Viennale (for Vienna's international film festival).

Characteristics 
According to author Federica Martini, what is at stake in contemporary biennales is the diplomatic/international relations potential as well as urban regeneration plans. Besides being mainly focused on the present (the “here and now” where the cultural event takes place and their effect of "spectacularisation of the everyday"), because of their site-specificity cultural events may refer back to,  produce or frame the history of the site and communities' collective memory.

A strong and influent symbol of biennales and of large-scale international exhibitions in general is the Crystal Palace, the gigantic and futuristic London architecture that hosted the Great Exhibition in 1851. According to philosopher Peter Sloterdijk, the Crystal Palace is the first attempt to condense the representation of the world in a unitary exhibition space, where the main exhibit is society itself in an a-historical, spectacular condition. The Crystal Palace main motives were the affirmation of British economic and national leadership and the creation of moments of spectacle. In this respect, 19th century World fairs provided a visual crystallization of colonial culture and were, at the same time, forerunners of contemporary theme parks.

The Venice Biennale as an archetype 

The Venice Biennale, a periodical large-scale cultural event founded in 1895, served as an archetype of the biennales. Meant to become a World Fair focused on contemporary art, the Venice Biennale used as a pretext the wedding anniversary of the Italian king and followed up to several national exhibitions organised after Italy unification in 1861. The Biennale immediately put forth issues of city marketing, cultural tourism and urban regeneration, as it was meant to reposition Venice on the international cultural map after the crisis due to the end of the Grand Tour model and the weakening of the Venetian school of painting. Furthermore, the Gardens where the Biennale takes place were an abandoned city area that needed to be re-functionalised. In cultural terms, the Biennale was meant to provide on a biennial basis a platform for discussing contemporary art practices that were not represented in fine arts museums at the time. The early Biennale model already included some key points that are still constitutive of large-scale international art exhibitions today: a mix of city marketing, internationalism, gentrification issues and destination culture, and the spectacular, large scale of the event.

Biennials after the 1990s 
The situation of biennials has changed in the contemporary context: while at its origin in 1895 Venice was a unique cultural event, but since the 1990s hundreds of biennials have been organized across the globe. Given the ephemeral and irregular nature of some biennials, there is little consensus on the exact number of biennials in existence at any given time.  Furthermore, while Venice was a unique agent in the presentation of contemporary art, since the 1960s several museums devoted to contemporary art are exhibiting the contemporary scene on a regular basis. Another point of difference concerns 19th century internationalism in the arts, that was brought into question by post-colonial debates and criticism of the contemporary art “ethnic marketing”, and also challenged the Venetian and World Fair’s national representation system. As a consequence of this, Eurocentric tendency to implode the whole word in an exhibition space, which characterises both the Crystal Palace and the Venice Biennale, is affected by the expansion of the artistic geographical map to scenes traditionally considered as marginal. The birth of the Havana Biennial in 1984 is widely considered an important counterpoint to the Venetian model for its prioritization of artists working in the Global South and curatorial rejection of the national pavilion model.

International biennales 
In the term's most commonly used context of major recurrent art exhibitions:

 Adelaide Biennial of Australian Art, South Australia
 Asian Art Biennale, in Taichung, Taiwan (National Taiwan Museum of Fine Arts)
 Athens Biennale, in Athens, Greece
 Bienal de Arte Paiz, in Guatemala City, Guatemala
 Arts in Marrakech (AiM) International Biennale (Arts in Marrakech Festival)
 Bamako Encounters, a biennale of photography in Mali
 Bat-Yam International Biennale of Landscape Urbanism
 Beijing Biennale
 Berlin Biennale (contemporary art biennale, to be distinguished from Berlinale, which is a film festival)
 Bergen Assembly (triennial for contemporary art in Bergen, Norway)www.bergenassembly.no
 Bi-City Biennale of Urbanism\Architecture, in Shenzhen and Hong Kong, China
 Bienal de Arte de Ponce in Ponce, Puerto Rico
 Biënnale van België, Biennial of Belgium, Belgium
 BiennaleOnline Online biennial exhibition of contemporary art from the most promising emerging artists.
 Biennial of Hawaii Artists
 Biennale de la Biche, the smallest biennale in the world held at deserted island near Guadeloupe, French overseas region
 , in Shiga, Japan
 La Biennale de Montreal
 Biennale of Luanda : Pan-African Forum for the Culture of Peace, Angola
 Boom Festival, international music and culture festival in Idanha-a-Nova, Portugal
 Bucharest Biennale in Bucharest, Romania
 Bushwick Biennial, in Bushwick, Brooklyn, New York
 Canakkale Biennial, in Canakkale, Turkey
 Cerveira International Art Biennial, Vila Nova de Cerveira, Portugal 
 Changwon Sculpture Biennale in Changwon, South Korea
 Dakar Biennale, also called Dak'Art, biennale in Dakar, Senegal
 Documenta, contemporary art exhibition held every five years in Kassel, Germany
 Estuaire (biennale), biennale in Nantes and Saint-Nazaire, France
 EVA International, biennial in Limerick, Republic of Ireland
 Göteborg International Biennial for Contemporary Art, in Gothenburg, Sweden
 Greater Taipei Contemporary Art Biennial, in Taipei, Taiwan
 Gwangju Biennale, Asia's first and most prestigious contemporary art biennale
 Havana biennial, in Havana, Cuba
 Helsinki Biennial, in Helsinki, Finland
 Herzliya Biennial For Contemporary Art, in Herzliya, Israel
 Incheon Women Artists' Biennale, in Incheon, South Korea
 Iowa Biennial, in Iowa, USA
 Istanbul Biennial, in Istanbul, Turkey
 International Roaming Biennial of Tehran, in Tehran and Istanbul
 Jakarta Biennale, in Jakarta, Indonesia
 Jerusalem Biennale, in Jerusalem, Israel
 Jogja Biennale, in Yogyakarta, Indonesia
 Karachi Biennale, in Karachi, Pakistan
 Keelung Harbor Biennale, in Keelung, Taiwan
 Kochi-Muziris Biennale, largest art exhibition in India, in Kochi, Kerala, India
 Kortrijk Design Biennale Interieur, in Kortrijk, Belgium
 Kobe Biennale, in Japan
 Kuandu Biennale, in Taipei, Taiwan
 Lagos Biennial, in Lagos, Nigeria
 Light Art Biennale Austria, in Austria
 Liverpool Biennial, in Liverpool, UK
  (LIAF), on the Lofoten archipelago, Norway
 Manifesta, European Biennale of contemporary art in different European cities
 Mediations Biennale, in Poznań, Poland
 Melbourne International Biennial 1999
 Mediterranean Biennale in Sakhnin 2013
  (formerly known as Le Mois de la Photo à Montréal), in Montreal, Canada
 , in Moss, Norway
 Moscow Biennale, in Moscow, Russia
 Munich Biennale, new opera and music-theatre in even-numbered years
 Mykonos Biennale
 Nakanojo Biennale
 NGV Triennial, contemporary art exhibition held every three years at the National Gallery of Victoria, Melbourne, Australia
 OSTEN Biennial of Drawing Skopje, North Macedonia
 Biennale de Paris
 Riga International Biennial of Contemporary Art (RIBOCA), in Riga, Latvia
São Paulo Art Biennial, in São Paulo, Brazil
 SCAPE Public Art Christchurch Biennial in Christchurch, New Zealand
 Prospect New Orleans
 Seoul Biennale of Architecture and Urbanism
 Sequences, in Reykjavík, Iceland
 Shanghai Biennale
 Sharjah Biennale, in Sharjah, UAE
 Singapore Biennale, held in various locations across the city-state island of Singapore
 Screen City Biennial, in Stavanger, Norway
 Biennale of Sydney
 Taipei Biennale, in Taipei, Taiwan
 Taiwan Arts Biennale, in Taichung, Taiwan (National Taiwan Museum of Fine Arts)
 Taiwan Film Biennale, in Hammer Museum, Los Angeles, U.S.A.
 , in Thessaloniki, Greece
 Dream city, produced by ART Rue Association in Tunisia
 Vancouver Biennale 
 Visayas Islands Visual Arts Exhibition and Conference (VIVA ExCon) in the Philippines  
 Venice Biennale, in Venice, Italy, which includes:
 Venice Biennale of Contemporary Art
 Venice Biennale of Architecture
 Venice Film Festival
 Vladivostok biennale of Visual Arts, in Vladivostok, Russia
 Whitney Biennial, hosted by the Whitney Museum of American Art, in New York City, NY, USA
 Web Biennial, produced with teams from Athens, Berlin and Istanbul.
 West Africa Architecture Biennale, Virtual in Lagos, Nigeria.
  WRO Biennale, in Wrocław, Poland
 Music Biennale Zagreb
 [SHIFT:ibpcpa] The International Biennale of Performance, Collaborative and Participatory Arts, Nomadic, International, Scotland, UK.

See also 
 World's fair
 Art exhibition
 Art festival
Art biennials in Africa

References

Further reading 
 
 (Spanish) Niemojewski, Rafal (2013) “Venecia o La Habana: Una polémica sobre la génesis de la bienal contemporánea.” Denken Pensée Thought Mysl... Criterios, Issue 47 (October).
 (Spanish) Ojeda, D, de la Nuez, R (eds), Trazos discontinuos. Antología crítica sobre las bienales de arte en Asia Pacífico. (Discontinuous strokes. Critical anthology of art biennials in Asia Pacific). Leiden: Almenara Press. ISBN 978-94-92260-47-5
 
  Vittoria Martini e Federica Martini, Just another exhibition. Histories and politics of biennials, Postmedia Books, 2011 , 
 Federica Martini, Cultural event in Mobile A2K Methodology guide, 2002.
 
 
 Niemojewski, Rafal (2006) "Whence Come You, and Whither Are you Going? On the Memory and Identity of Biennials" Manifesta Journal, MJ – Journal of Contemporary Curatorship, N°6 Winter 2005/06
 Niemojewski, Rafal (2014) ”Turning the Tide: the oppositional past and uncertain future of the contemporary biennial” Seismopolite: Journal of Art and Politics, Volume 1, Issue 6, (February).
 Niemojewski, Rafal (2018) “Contemporary Art Biennials: Decline or Resurgence?” Cultural Politics, Duke University Press, Volume 14, Issue 1, (Spring).
 Niemojewski, Rafal (2021) Biennials: The Exhibitions We Love to Hate, Lund Humphries. ISBN 9781848223882

External links 
 Biennial Foundation site dedicated to biennales around the world
 
 

Art biennials